Thomas James Swiney (1 January 187515 October 1945) was an Australian politician. He was a member of the New South Wales Legislative Assembly for one term from 1920 until 1922. He was a member of the Labor Party (ALP) .

Swiney was born in Balranald, New South Wales and worked as a farmer. At the 1920 election, he was the first candidate on the ALP list and won the third and last position in the multi-member seat of Byron. Swiney was defeated at the 1922 election by 223 votes. He later held positions with the Aboriginal Protection Board. He did not hold ministerial or party office.

References

 

1875 births
1945 deaths
Members of the New South Wales Legislative Assembly
Australian Labor Party members of the Parliament of New South Wales